Blair E. Prinsep is a New Zealand rugby union player. His position of choice is Prop. He is the brother of another Rugby union player Reed Prinsep.

Tasman
In 2017 Prinsep took a break from rugby to recover from injury. Prinsep made 7 appearances for the Mako in the 2018 season but missed the 2019 season with injury which the Mako side won for the first time unbeaten. He was not named in the 2020 Tasman Mako squad but did play 3 games in the 2020 season as the Mako won their second premiership title in a row.

References

External links
itsrugby.co.uk profile

Living people
New Zealand rugby union players
1995 births
Tasman rugby union players
Rugby union props
Rugby union players from Christchurch